The Sarn Complex is a group of closely related igneous rocks that intrude and cut through other rock lithologies in the Cymru Terrane in Wales.  The complex outcrops on the Llyn Peninsula in a variety of places including Mynydd Cefnamlwch and the flanks of Pen y Gopa.

Geological information 
The largest plutonic body in the terrane has limited outcrop and is sheared by the Llyn Shear Zone in the west and covered by later (Arenig) sediments to the east. Altered to greenschist facies the pluton contains a  bimodal suite of gabbro-diorite, monzogranite (Sarn Granite) and granodiorite.

The Sarn Granite is leucocratic and covers an expanse of about 6 km2 in contrast to the gabbro and diorite that exist as small and scattered exposures. The dioritic component of the complex has been confirmed as having a Neoproterozoic age of 614 ±2 Ma using U-Pb zircon dating. Therefore, the shearing of the Llyn is also temporally constrained by the date.

References

External links 
 The Geology of Wales – BGS
 BGS Rock Lexicon

Precambrian Europe
Geology of Wales
Geological groups of the United Kingdom